Percy John Beswicke (22 February 1881 – 7 June 1944) was an Australian rules footballer who played with Melbourne in the Victorian Football League (VFL).

Notes

External links 

1881 births
Australian rules footballers from Melbourne
Melbourne Football Club players
1944 deaths
People from Hawthorn, Victoria